Çarxaçu (also, Charkhachu and Dzharkhachy) is a village and municipality in the Quba Rayon of Azerbaijan.  It has a population of 220.

References 

Populated places in Quba District (Azerbaijan)